Corsaren was a Danish language weekly satirical and political magazine published by Meïr Aron Goldschmidt, who also wrote most of its content. The magazine was based in Copenhagen, Denmark, and was published between 1840 and 1846.

History and profile
The first issue of Corsaren was published on 8 October 1840 in Copenhagen. The first six months there were no fewer than six editors due to censorship issues. It was not until the 161st issue three years later that Goldschmidt's name was printed on the back as its publisher. In 1842 Goldschmidt was sentenced to 24 days in prison, a fine of 200 rigsdaler and future censorship.

The Kierkegaard Affair
Corsaren played an important role in the life of Søren Kierkegaard to the point that Kierkegaard could divide his life into a before and after Corsaren. This was a fight that Kierkegaard, to a certain degree, started himself when he under the pseudonym Frater Taciturnus in a five-page article called "The Work of a Traveling Aesthete" ("En omreisende Æsthetikers Virksomhed") in The Fatherland (Fædrelandet) on 27 December 1845 wrote: "Hopefully I will soon appear in The Corsair. It is really hard for a poor writer to be thus singled out in Danish literature that he (assuming we pseudonyms are one) is the only one that is not scolded there." And again on 10 January 1846: "... can I ask to be scolded ...".

Goldschmidt was forced to sell Corsaren in 1846 for 1,500 rigsdaler.

See also
List of magazines in Denmark

References

  

1840 establishments in Denmark
1846 disestablishments in Denmark
Danish-language magazines
Satirical magazines published in Denmark
Weekly magazines published in Denmark
Defunct magazines published in Denmark
Defunct political magazines
Magazines established in 1840
Magazines disestablished in 1846
Magazines published in Copenhagen
Political magazines published in Denmark